Frederick Woodruff "Ted" Field (born June 1, 1953) is an American media mogul, record executive, entrepreneur and film producer.

He co-founded Interscope Records with Jimmy Iovine and founded Interscope Communications to develop and produce films in 1982, and produced his first hit, Revenge of the Nerds, the same year. 

He is an heir of the Marshall Field family.

Early life
Field was born on June 1, 1953 in Chicago, Illinois, the son of Marshall Field IV, who owned the Chicago Sun-Times from 1956 to 1965, and Katherine Woodruff Fanning, who was later an editor of several newspapers.

Field's parents divorced when he was young. Field's mother then married Larry Fanning, who became Field's stepfather. Field, his sisters, his mother and his stepfather moved to Anchorage, Alaska. Field's mother and Larry Fanning purchased the Anchorage Daily News from founder Norman C. Brown in 1967. Larry Fanning died in 1971: Kay Fanning continued to operate the paper until 1979 when she sold it to The McClatchy Company. She remained as publisher until 1983.

Field attended Pomona College in Claremont, California, graduating in 1979.

Career
Field's Interscope Racing started off entering Danny Ongais in Formula 5000 in 1975, graduating to USAC racing and the Indianapolis 500 in Parnelli chassis. Field also funded Ongais to make occasional Formula One outings in a Penske during the 1977 season.

Field also backed the construction in 1980 of an Interscope chassis designed by Roman Slobodinskij for the Indianapolis 500. This was intended to take a turbocharged six-cylinder Porsche engine (similar to the one Ongais and Field were using in their Porsche 935) but a dispute with USAC over turbo boost meant the program was abandoned. The car was eventually fitted with a conventional Ford Cosworth DFX engine and entered in the 1981 500. Ongais led the race but crashed and was critically injured. In 1982 a recovered Ongais gave the car one last start at Indy but that too ended with an accident.

In 1982, Field founded Interscope Communications,  which produced more than 50 major films. In 1984, Field was a leader of a group that bought movie camera manufacturer Panavision. In 1987, Panavision was sold to Lee International. In 1990, he co-founded Interscope Records. After leaving Interscope in January 2001, he formed ARTISTdirect Records with the backing of BMG. Ted Field is currently chairman and CEO of Radar Pictures.

Field and Radar Pictures have faced legal action in recent years over allegations of fraudulent misconduct. In December 2016, Field and his company assigned profits from then-upcoming Jumanji: Welcome to the Jungle (2017), to Filmula Entertainment, to satisfy a breach-of-contract over the unsuccessful reboot of Trauma Records.

Personal life
From 1984 to 1998, he owned a mansion formerly owned by Howard B. Keck located at 1244 Moraga Drive in the gated community of Moraga Estates in Bel Air, California. From 1986 through 1993, Field owned the Harold Lloyd Estate (also known as Green Acres) in Beverly Hills, California.  Field is a tournament chess player who sponsored the 1990 World Chess Championship in NYC between Garry Kasparov and Anatoly Karpov. He is currently developing a movie about the current world chess champion Magnus Carlsen.

Racing record

24 Hours of Le Mans results

Filmography (producer)
He was a producer in all films unless otherwise noted.

Film

Thanks

Television

As an actor

See also
 Madsen, Axel. The Marshall Fields: The Evolution of an American Business Dynasty. Wiley: 2002.

References

External links 
 
 Filmbug: Ted Field biography

1953 births
24 Hours of Daytona drivers
24 Hours of Le Mans drivers
Film producers from Illinois
Living people
Racing drivers from Chicago
Marshall Field family
Pomona College alumni
Formula One team owners
Field family
IndyCar Series team owners
Sports car racing team owners